Diana Laura Bulimar (born 22 August 1995) is a Romanian artistic gymnast and a 2-time European Champion with Romania. She was part of the Romanian team at the 2012 Summer Olympics that won the bronze medal.

Junior career

2010 
In April, Bulimar competed at the 2010 European Women's Artistic Gymnastics Championships in Birmingham, United Kingdom.  She contributed an all around score of 54.525 toward the Romanian team's second-place finish.  Individually, she placed fourth in the all around final with a score of 54.175.  In event finals, she placed third on uneven bars scoring 13.575 and fourth on floor scoring 14.175.

In August, Bulimar competed at the Youth Olympic Games in Singapore.  She placed sixth in the all around competition with a score of 53.950.  In event finals, she placed seventh on vault scoring 13.412, seventh on uneven bars scoring 12.525, and second on floor scoring 14.325.

In September, Bulimar competed at the Romanian National Championships in Reşiţa, Romania.  She placed second in the all around competition with a score of 54.750.

Senior career

2011
In August, Bulimar competed at the Romanian National Championships in Onesti, Romania.  She placed fourth in the all around with a score of 56.375.

In September, Bulimar at an international meet against Germany and Switzerland in Erzingen, Germany.  She helped Romania to win the team competition and individually she placed third in the all around with a score of 56.350.

In October, Bulimar competed at the 2011 World Artistic Gymnastics Championships in Tokyo, Japan.  She contributed a floor score of 14.266 toward the Romanian team's fourth-place finish.

2012
In March, Bulimar competed at the Artistic Gymnastics World Cup event in Doha, Qatar. She placed fifth on uneven bars with a score of 14.275 and second on floor with a score of 14.725.

In April, Bulimar competed at an international meet against France in Cholet, France. She helped Romania to win the team competition with scores of 13.550 on uneven bars, 14.900 on balance beam, and 14.400 on floor.

Later in April, Bulimar competed at an international meet against Germany and the United Kingdom in Ulm, Germany. She helped Romania to win the team competition with scores of 13.950 on uneven bars, 14.550 on balance beam, and 14.450 on floor.

In May, Bulimar competed at the 2012 European Women's Artistic Gymnastics Championships in Brussels, Belgium.  She contributed scores of 13.933 on uneven bars, 14.733 on balance beam, and 14.633 on floor towards the Romanian team's first-place finish.

In June, Bulimar competed at the Artistic Gymnastics World Cup event in Ghent, Belgium.  She placed second on balance beam with a score of 14.625 and first on floor with a score of 14.375.

At the beginning of July, Bulimar competed at an international meet against France, Germany, and Italy in Bucharest, Romania. She helped Romania to win the team competition with scores of 14.100 on uneven bars, 15.400 on balance beam, and 14.500 on floor.

London Olympics 
At the end of July, Bulimar competed at the 2012 Summer Olympics in London, United Kingdom.  She helped the Romanian team qualify in fourth place to the team final and individually she qualified to the balance beam final with a score of 14.866.  In the team final, she contributed scores of 14.066 on uneven bars, 14.533 on balance beam, and 14.700 on floor towards the Romanian team's third-place finish. However, it was decided that Larisa Iordache would take place in the balance beam final instead of Bulimar.

2013
At the 2013 La Roche-sur-Yon World Cup, Bulimar placed second on floor.

At the 6th Doha FIG World Challenge Cup in Qatar, Bulimar placed fifth on the uneven bars final on 28 March 2013. On 29 March, she placed fourth on the balance beam final and first on the floor exercise final ahead of compatriot Larisa Iordache with a score of 14.625.

At the 2013 European Championships in Moscow, Russia, Bulimar placed second in the all-around qualification, sixth on individual vault, twenty-sixth on the uneven bars qualification, second on balance beam qualification and fifth on floor exercise qualification on 18 April. On 19 April, she tied with Giulia Steingruber of Switzerland for fourth place in the all-around final with a score of 57.065.

In June she won gold on floor exercise (tied with teammate Larisa Iordache) and bronze on beam at the 2013 Anadia World Cup. Her last competition of the year was the Turnen Dames Interland where she won gold in the all-around, balance beam, and floor exercise, and a bronze on uneven bars. She was scheduled to compete at the Romanian National Championships, but she dislocated her kneecap during podium training and needed immediate surgery, taking her out for the rest of the season.

2014 

Bulimar's first competition back was the Doha World Cup. She finished in fourth on beam with a 13.650, and she won silver on floor behind teammate Larisa Iordache with a 14.300. She competed at a friendly meet against Belgium and France where she won gold with the team and silver in the all-around.

Bulimar's last competition of the season was the European Championships. She contributed a 14.133 on bars, a 14.533 on beam, and a	14.225 on floor towards Romania's team gold medal. She qualified for the floor final where she tied with Marta Pihan-Kulesza for fourth. For the second year in a row, Bulimar had to miss Romanian Nationals and the World Championships due to a knee injury.

2015 

Bulimar once again made her return at the Doha World Cup. She won a silver on bars with a 13.600 behind Youna Dufournet. She also won a bronze on beam with a 14.025 behind Phan Thị Hà Thanh and Giulia Steingruber.

In April she competed at the 2015 European Artistic Gymnastics Championships and placed 10th in the all-around.

In June, Bulimar underwent surgery on her right knee, causing her to miss the European Games. She returned to competition in September at a friendly meet between Romania and France where she helped her team to the gold medal, competing on bars and beam, and performing her floor routine on a tumble track to facilitate her recovery. At the Romanian Championships at the end of September, she won the bronze medal in the all-around competition along with a silver on the beam. She followed this with good results at the Novara Cup in Novara, Italy, where the Romanian team triumphed over Italy, Belgium and Spain, and Bulimar individually finished fourth and took the bronze medal on beam.

Bulimar was named to the Romanian team for the World Championships along with Larisa Iordache, Anamaria Ocolișan, Laura Jurca, Silvia Zarzu, and Cătălina Ponor. However, Ponor withdrew after having surgery, and alternate Andreea Iridon was put in. On the day before the qualification round, Ocolișan injured her ankle and could not compete. The Romanians were in the first subdivision of qualifications and had a very bad competition, qualifying in thirteenth place and failing to automatically qualify their team to the Olympic Games for the first time since 1966.  Their performance was described as a meltdown as everyone except Jurca fell off the uneven bars and they had several falls off the balance beam. Diana fell twice on the uneven bars and finished individually in 56th place after qualifications with an all-around score of 52.591. Nadia Comăneci was interviewed after their performance, and she stated, "It's not the best year for them. I know they have a few girls that aren't of age who are in the plan for next year's Olympics. There's been a lot of accidents also. It wasn't very smooth for everybody and psychologically on top of that, Ocolisan's injury hit them hard." Bulimar and her teammates were seen crying afterwards.

In November Bulimar competed at the Arthur Gander Memorial in Morges, Switzerland, a competition in which each gymnast competes on only three pieces of apparatus. She chose to perform on the vault, beam and floor, and won the bronze medal behind teammate Larisa Iordache and Germany's Pauline Schäfer. She followed this with the Elite Gym Massilia meet in Marseille, France, where she performed cleanly to help team Romania to the bronze medal, along with winning the bronze all-around medal behind Russia's Angelina Melnikova and France's Marine Brevet, and winning the gold medal on the floor exercise.

2016 
Bulimar competed at the Doha World Cup in March. She finished eighth on the uneven bars with a score of 11.925. In April, she competed in the Belgium Friendly. The Romanian team won silver behind Belgium. She won a bronze medal in the all-around with a score of 55.400. She tied for gold on the balance beam with Belgium's Axelle Klinckaert and Bulimar won gold on floor.

Bulimar was named to the team for the 2016 Olympic Test Event, Romania's last chance to qualify as a full team to the 2016 Olympics along with Cătălina Ponor, Anamaria Ocolișan, Laura Jurca, Silvia Zarzu, and Dora Vulcan. However, Jurca had to withdraw due an ankle injury and was replaced by Andreea Iridon, who also withdrew and was replaced by Maria Holbura. Romania competed in the first subdivision, and they finished seventh out of the eight teams. Bulimar only scored an 11.733 on the uneven bars because of a fall, and Romania had to count her score towards their total. Bulimar's all-around total was 53.940. In a press conference after the competition, Adrian Stoica, the president of the Romanian Gymnastics Federation, announced that the one individual spot Romania had at the Olympics would go to either Iordache or Ponor, leaving Bulimar out of contention.

In May, Bulimar ruptured her Achilles tendon while training floor exercise.

Eponymous skill
Bulimar has one eponymous skill listed in the Code of Points.

Competitive history

References

External links 

 
 
 
 

1995 births
Sportspeople from Timișoara
Living people
Romanian female artistic gymnasts
Gymnasts at the 2010 Summer Youth Olympics
Originators of elements in artistic gymnastics
Gymnasts at the 2012 Summer Olympics
Olympic gymnasts of Romania
Olympic medalists in gymnastics
Olympic bronze medalists for Romania
Medalists at the 2012 Summer Olympics
European champions in gymnastics
21st-century Romanian women